Mindgames is the second album by saxophonist Greg Osby recorded in 1988 and released on the JMT label.

Reception
The AllMusic review by Ron Wynn states, "Some torrid solos but his least successful release artistically".

Track listing
All compositions by Greg Osby except as indicated
 "Dolemite" - 5:43  
 "Mindgames" - 5:27  
 "Thinking Inside You" (Edward Simon) - 3:27  
 "This Is Not a Test" - 4:11  
 "Excuse Not" (Paul Samuels) - 1:50  
 "Mirror, Mirror" - 4:56  
 "Silent Attitude" - 7:30  
 "Altered Ego" (Kevin McNeal) - 4:50  
 "All That Matters" - 6:32  
 "Chin Lang" - 2:36

Personnel
Greg Osby - alto saxophone, soprano saxophone, percussion, voice
Geri Allen (tracks 1,7 & 9), Edward Simon (tracks 2, 3, 5, 6 & 8) - piano, synthesizer
Kevin McNeal - guitar
Lonnie Plaxico - bass
Paul Samuels - drums, percussion

References 

1988 albums
Greg Osby albums
JMT Records albums
Winter & Winter Records albums